Novorusov is a rural locality (a khutor) in Zarevskoye Rural Settlement of Shovgenovsky District, the Republic of Adygea, Russia. The population was 95 as of 2018. There is 1 street.

Geography 
Novorusov is located 9 km southwest of Khakurinokhabl (the district's administrative centre) by road. Mikhaylov is the nearest rural locality.

References 

Rural localities in Shovgenovsky District